The 2021 Leinster Senior Football Championship Final was played at Croke Park in Dublin on 1 August 2021. It was contested by Dublin and Kildare. Dublin won an 11th consecutive title.

Match details

Notes

References

2L Final
Leinster Senior Football Championship Finals
Dublin county football team matches
Kildare county football team matches